Senator Morrissey may refer to:

John P. Morrissey (politician) (1885–1966), New York State Senate
John Morrissey (1831–1878), New York State Senate
Michael W. Morrissey (born 1954), Massachusetts State Senate
Pierce A. Morrissey (1870–1956), Wisconsin State Senate